The Sir Walter Scott Way is a  long-distance footpath in the Scottish Borders. The route broadly follows the waymarked Southern Upland Way, except for in a few sections. It commemorates Sir Walter Scott, one of Scotland's most renowned writers, who had many connections with the area.

The 'Sir Walter Scott Way' runs from Moffat in Dumfries and Galloway to Cockburnspath and it is divided into six sections. It passes through Ettrick Head, St. Mary's Loch, Tibbie Shiels, Traquair, Selkirk, Galashiels, Yair, Melrose, Lauder, Longformacus, Watch Water Reservoir, and Abbey St Bathans.

See also
St. Cuthbert's Way
Borders Abbeys Way
Long-distance footpaths in the United Kingdom

References

External links
Gazetteer for Scotland: Sir Walter Scott

 
Long-distance footpaths in Scotland
Walter Scott
Footpaths in the Scottish Borders